Courbet is a general purpose stealth frigate of the French Navy (Marine Nationale) of the . She is the third French vessel named after the 19th century admiral Amédée Courbet.

Construction and career
Courbet took part in Opération Baliste. On 3 October 2006, an Israeli fighter aircraft penetrated her  defence perimeter without responding to radio calls, triggering a diplomatic incident. Israel apologised after official protests from the French government. Throughout September the ship was involved in anti-piracy operations off the coast of Somalia, helping to recapture a yacht taken by pirates on 2 September.

In December 2009 Courbet escorted the French Navy cruiser  on her final voyage. This was last trip of the helicopter carrier that served as a floating embassy and symbol of the French Navy for 46 years. Jeanne d'Arcs last voyage in company with Courbet included visits to Africa, South America including Rio de Janeiro to Buenos Aires, the French Antilles, the United States including New York City, and Canada. The voyage was completed sometime in May 2010.

In June 2020, while on patrol to counter alleged arms smuggling to Libya, France claimed that Turkish frigates illuminated Courbet three times with their fire control radar, a claim which was denied by Turkish officials.

On her first operational deployment after her mid-life upgrade, Courbet, operating in the Gulf of Guinea in conjunction with the helicopter assault ship , was involved in the seizure of just under 2 tons of drugs in May 2022.

Upgrade
Courbet was the first ship of her class to begin a mid-life upgrade in October 2020. The upgrade is designed to permit the frigate to operate through the 2020s and into the 2030s and incorporates the addition of hull-mounted sonar, improved point air defence systems as well as the capacity to carry the latest variant of the Exocet anti-ship missile. The frigate returned to sea in June 2021 following her upgrade. She is projected to remain in service until 2032.

In future it is also planned to incorporate the CANTO anti-torpedo countermeasures system in the frigate.

References

External links

  Marine nationale, Frégate type La Fayette Presentation-Courbet (F 712)

La Fayette-class frigates
Frigates of France
1994 ships